Buffalo Springfield was a rock band formed in Los Angeles by Canadian musicians Neil Young, Bruce Palmer and Dewey Martin and American musicians Stephen Stills and Richie Furay. The group, widely known for the song "For What It's Worth", released three albums and several singles from 1966 to 1968. Their music combined elements of folk music and country music with British Invasion and psychedelic rock influences. Like contemporary band the Byrds, they were key to the early development of folk rock. The band took their name from a steamroller parked outside their house.

Buffalo Springfield formed in Los Angeles in 1966 with Stills (guitar, keyboards, vocals), Martin (drums, vocals), Palmer (bass guitar), Furay (guitar, vocals) and Young (guitar, harmonica, piano, vocals). The band signed to Atlantic Records in 1966 and released their debut single "Nowadays Clancy Can't Even Sing", which became a hit in Los Angeles. The following January, they released the protest song "For What It's Worth", which became their only US top 10 hit and a counterculture anthem. Their second album, Buffalo Springfield Again, marked their progression to psychedelia and hard rock and featured other well-known songs such as "Bluebird" and "Mr. Soul".

After several drug-related arrests and line-up changes, the group disbanded in 1968. Their third and final album, Last Time Around, was compiled and released shortly after their dissolution. Stephen Stills went on to form the supergroup Crosby, Stills & Nash with David Crosby of the Byrds and Graham Nash of the Hollies. Neil Young launched his solo career and later joined Stills in Crosby, Stills, Nash & Young in 1969. Furay, along with Jim Messina, went on to form the country-rock band Poco. Buffalo Springfield was inducted into the Rock and Roll Hall of Fame in 1997, and briefly reunited for a comeback tour in 2011.

History

Origins 
Neil Young and Stephen Stills met in 1965, at the Fourth Dimension in Thunder Bay, Ontario. Young was there with the Squires, a Winnipeg group he had been leading since February 1963, and Stills was on tour with the Company, a spin-off from the Au Go Go Singers. When Stills' band broke up at the end of that tour, he moved to the West Coast, where he worked as a session musician and auditioned unsuccessfully for, among other bands, the Monkees. Told by record producer Barry Friedman there would be work available if he could assemble a band, Stills invited fellow Au Go Go Singers alumnus Richie Furay and former Squires bass player Ken Koblun to come join him in California. Both agreed, although Koblun chose to leave before very long and joined the group 3's a Crowd.

While in Toronto in early 1966, Young met Bruce Palmer, a Canadian who was playing bass for the Mynah Birds. In need of a lead guitarist, Palmer invited Young to join the group, and Young accepted. The Mynah Birds were set to record an album for Motown Records when their singer Ricky James Matthews—James Ambrose Johnson, Jr., later known as Rick James—was tracked down and arrested by the U.S. Navy for being AWOL.

With their record deal cancelled, Young and Palmer pawned the Mynah Birds' musical equipment and bought a 1953 Pontiac hearse, which they drove to Los Angeles. Young and Palmer arrived in L.A. hoping to meet Stephen Stills, who, as Young had learned, was living in the city. However, after almost a week of searching clubs and coffeehouses, the pair had been unable to find Stills. Consequently, on April 6, 1966, Young and Palmer decided to leave Los Angeles and drive north to San Francisco. While the two were stuck in traffic on Sunset Boulevard, they were spotted by Stills and Richie Furay, who were heading the other direction down Sunset. Stills and Furay managed to switch lanes and maneuver behind Young's hearse, at which point the musicians pulled off the road and reunited.

Drummer Dewey Martin, who had played with garage rock group the Standells and with country artists such as Patsy Cline and the Dillards, joined at the suggestion of the Byrds' manager, Jim Dickson. The group's name was taken from a brand of steamroller made by the Buffalo-Springfield Roller Company. The new group debuted on 11 April 1966, at The Troubadour in West Hollywood, five days after the chance encounter on Sunset Boulevard. A few days later, they began a short tour of California as the opening act for the Dillards and the Byrds.

Management and first recordings 
Chris Hillman of the Byrds persuaded the owners of the Whisky a Go Go to give Buffalo Springfield an audition, and they essentially became the house band at the Whisky for seven weeks, from May 2 to June 18, 1966. This series of concerts solidified the band's reputation for live performances and attracted interest from a number of record labels. It also brought an invitation from Friedman to Dickie Davis (who had been the Byrds' lighting manager) to become involved in the group's management. In turn, Davis sought advice from Sonny & Cher's management team, Charlie Greene and Brian Stone; unbeknownst to Davis and Friedman, Greene and Stone then aggressively pitched themselves to the band to be their new managers. Friedman was fired, and Davis was made the group's tour manager. Greene and Stone made a deal with Ahmet Ertegun of Atlantic Records for a four-album contract with a $12,000 advance, following a brief bidding war with Elektra Records and Warner Bros. Records, and arranged for the band to start recording at Gold Star Studios in Hollywood.

The first Buffalo Springfield single, "Nowadays Clancy Can't Even Sing", was released in August, but made little impact outside Los Angeles, where it reached the top 25. Young and Stills have long maintained that their own mono mix was superior to the stereo mix engineered by Greene and Stone. The band's eponymous album was released by Atlantic subsidiary Atco in mono and in stereo in December 1966. A revamped version issued both in mono and stereo with a different track order was issued in March of the following year.

In November 1966, Stills composed "For What It's Worth", responding to a protest that had turned violent following the closing of the Pandora's Box nightclub on Sunset Strip. The song was performed on Thanksgiving night at the Whisky a Go Go, recorded within the next few days, and on the air in Los Angeles on radio station KHJ soon afterwards. By March 1967, it was a top ten hit. Atco took advantage of this momentum by replacing the song "Baby Don't Scold Me" with "For What It's Worth" and re-releasing the album. "For What It's Worth" sold over one million copies and was awarded a gold disc.

Lineup changes, arrest, and breakup 
In January 1967, Palmer was deported for possession of marijuana but returned to the group at the beginning of June, while Young was temporarily absent (guitarist Doug Hastings filled in for Young during this period). The band, with David Crosby sitting in for Young, played the Monterey Pop Festival. Young returned in August and the band severed ties with Greene and Stone, then divided its time between playing gigs and finalising the second album, ultimately titled Buffalo Springfield Again. Produced by Ertegun, Buffalo Springfield Again was released in November 1967. It includes "Mr. Soul", "Rock & Roll Woman", "Bluebird", "Sad Memory", and "Broken Arrow". The band toured as support for the Beach Boys during early 1968. In January of that year, after Palmer was again deported for drug possession, Jim Messina, who had worked as engineer on the band's second album, was hired as a permanent replacement on bass. During this period Young began to appear less and less frequently, and he often left Stills to handle lead guitar parts at concerts. Recording sessions were booked, and all the songs that appeared on the final album were recorded by the end of March, usually with Messina producing.

In the Netflix documentary Echo in the Canyon, Stills related an incident that illustrated the band's problems with law enforcement. The band were hosting a small rehearsal party, attended by Eric Clapton among others, in April 1968. Despite reportedly playing at a comfortable sound level, a police officer arrived after a disturbing the peace complaint. During the encounter, the officer smelled marijuana and Stills ran next door to "call lawyers," but in actuality went next door and escaped out the bathroom window. According to Stills, Young was going to chase the police down the street, to which Stills said "cause he's Canadian and I guess in Canada you can do that". Ultimately, Young, Furay and Messina were arrested and sent to the Los Angeles County Jail.

Following a gig at the Long Beach Auditorium on 5 May 1968, the band held a meeting with Ertegun to arrange their breakup. Stills and Furay stayed with Atlantic, while Young moved to Warner Brothers. Later, Furay and Messina compiled various tracks recorded between mid-1967 and early 1968 into the third and final studio album, Last Time Around (1968).

New Buffalo Springfield and reunion attempts 

Martin formed a new version of Buffalo Springfield in September 1968. Dubbed New Buffalo Springfield, the lineup consisted of guitarists Dave Price (Davy Jones's stand-in with the Monkees), Gary Rowles (son of jazz pianist Jimmy Rowles) who later joined Arthur Lee's Love, bass player Bob Apperson, drummer Don Poncher (also later a member of Love), and horn player Jim Price, who later became a top session musician for Delaney Bramlett, the Rolling Stones, Joe Cocker and others.

The new band toured extensively and appeared at the highly publicized Holiday Rock Festival in San Francisco on 25–26 December 1968, but soon ran afoul of Stills and Young, who took legal action to prevent Martin from using the band's name. Following an agreement to give up future royalties from Buffalo Springfield's recordings, Martin was allowed to use the name New Buffalo. He attempted to retrieve his rights in 1974 and though the matter was settled out of court, he felt that he had been mistreated.

In February 1969, Martin and Dave Price formed a second version of New Buffalo with guitarist Bob "BJ" Jones and bass player Randy Fuller, brother of the late Bobby Fuller. The band made some recordings with producer Tom Dowd overseeing, but they were scrapped. Another guitarist, Joey Newman (formerly of Don and the Goodtimes, later of the pioneering prog group Touch), was added in June 1969, but two months later Martin was fired, and the remaining members carried on as Blue Mountain Eagle. Martin then formed a new group called Medicine Ball, which released a lone album in 1970 for Uni Records. Martin also released two solo singles, one for Uni and one for RCA, which didn't appear on the album. During the 1970s, he retired from the music industry and became a car mechanic.

In 1984, Bruce Palmer teamed up with Frank Wilks (vocals, guitar), Stan Endersby (guitar) and Alan Prosser (drums) to form the Springfield Band, which became Buffalo Springfield Revisited in 1985 when Dewey Martin was brought up to Toronto to join, and off they went on tour for the next three to four years under this band name (though Martin dropped out by 1987). Neil Young and Stephen Stills gave Buffalo Springfield Revisited permission to tour with that name.

In July 1986, Palmer, Martin, Furay, Young and Stills gathered at Stills' house, with Buffalo Springfield Revisited keyboardist Harlan Spector, to rehearse for an apparent reunion tour. One of the 1986 rehearsals was video recorded. It was the last time all five original members performed together. Plans for a subsequent reunion tour were abandoned.

By 1990, Bruce Palmer and Frank Wilks had moved to Topanga, California, where Dennis Knicely joined to perform percussion. The following year they started White Buffalo along with Dewey Martin and others, then Martin formed the short lived Buffalo Springfield Again in 1991 with Billy Darnell (guitar), Robin Lambe (bass) and Michael Curtis (vocals, guitar). But Furay issued a cease and desist order on Martin in 1992 and he retired from music again the following year.

2010-11 reunion 
On his album Silver & Gold (2000), Young sang of his desire to re-form the group and to "see those guys again and give it a shot" in "Buffalo Springfield Again". Palmer (2004) and Martin (2009) later died, preventing a reunion of the original lineup.

Young, Stills and Furay reunited at the annual Bridge School Benefit concerts on October 23 and 24, 2010, in Mountain View, California. Rolling Stone called the performance "nostalgic, blissful, and moving".

The band reunited for six concerts starting in Oakland on 1 June 2011, followed by dates in Los Angeles and Santa Barbara, before moving on to play the 2011 Bonnaroo Music & Arts Festival in Manchester, Tennessee. The band consisted of Furay, Stills, Young, Rick Rosas and Joe Vitale. According to Furay and a band spokesman, the group planned a full tour in 2012, but this was delayed because Young was recording two new albums with Crazy Horse. On 27 February 2012, Furay announced that the band is on indefinite hiatus.

Legacy 
In 1968, Stills went on to form Crosby, Stills & Nash with David Crosby of the Byrds and Graham Nash of the Hollies. Meanwhile, Furay and Messina formed Poco, and Young launched his solo career. In 1969, Young reunited with Stills in Crosby, Stills, Nash & Young. After Crosby, Stills, Nash & Young, Stills joined with another former Byrd Chris Hillman (after his stint with the Flying Burrito Brothers) and others to form the group Manassas (1971–1973). Later, Furay joined J.D. Souther and Chris Hillman to form the Souther-Hillman-Furay Band, and Messina teamed with Kenny Loggins in Loggins & Messina.

In 1982–1983, Palmer was a bassist on Young's album Trans and toured with him in America and Europe, as seen on Neil Young in Berlin, filmed in 1982.

In 1997, Buffalo Springfield was inducted into the Rock and Roll Hall of Fame. A four-disc box set assembled by Young, Buffalo Springfield, was released in 2001. A further box set What's That Sound? Complete Albums Collection was released in 2018 by Rhino Records.

In popular culture 
The Buffalo Springfield appear as the house band in an episode of the detective series Mannix. The episode titled Warning: Live Blueberries originally aired October 28, 1967 (Season 1 Episode 7). During the episode they play versions of their hit songs "Bluebird" and "For What It's Worth".

Legendary Danish rock band Shu•bi•dua’s 1975 song Jeg Har Købt En Guitar mentions Buffalo Springfield as one of the bands inspiring the protagonist, along with the Olsen Brothers, the Shadows, and the Walkers.

Personnel 
 Jim Fielder – bass guitar 
 Richie Furay – guitar, vocals 
 Bruce Palmer – bass guitar 
 Stephen Stills – guitar, keyboards, vocals 
 Neil Young – guitar, harmonica, piano, vocals 
 Dewey Martin – drums, vocals 
 Ken Forssi – bass guitar 
 Ken Koblun – bass guitar 
 Doug Hastings – guitar 
 Jim Messina – bass guitar, vocals 

Additional musicians
 Rick Rosas – bass guitar 
 Joe Vitale – drums, vocals 
 Rusty Young – steel guitar on "Last Time Around"

Discography

Studio albums

Compilations

Singles

References

Further reading 
 Einarson, J. and Furay, R. (2004). For What It's Worth: The Story of Buffalo Springfield Lanham: Cooper Square Press. .
 Long, P. (1996). Ghosts on the Road—Neil Young in Concert London: Old Homestead Press. .

External links 
 Expecting To Fly – The Buffalo Springfield Story
 Chrome Oxide Buffalo Springfield Gigography – List of Recording Sessions and Performances
 
 
 
 
 

 
Atco Records artists
Folk rock groups from California
Musical groups from Los Angeles
Musical groups established in 1966
1966 establishments in California
Musical groups disestablished in 1968
1968 disestablishments in California
Musical groups reestablished in 2010
Musical groups disestablished in 2012
2012 disestablishments in California
Neil Young
Stephen Stills